Immer (German for Always) is a mix album by German electronic music artist Michael Mayer. It was released on 26 February 2002 on the Kompakt record label based in Cologne.

Reception

Online music magazine Pitchfork placed Immer at number 116 on its list of the top 200 albums of the 2000s.

In 2010, Resident Advisor placed Immer at number 1 on its list of top 50 mix CDs of the 2000s. In 2012, Rolling Stone ranked it at number 18 on its list of the 30 greatest EDM albums of all time.

Track listing

Notes

Michael Mayer (musician) albums
2002 compilation albums
Kompakt compilation albums